Ninoslav Marina (Skopje, Republic of Macedonia, September 25, 1974) is the Rector of the University of Information Science and Technology located in Ohrid, Republic of Macedonia.

Biography 
After completing undergraduate studies at the Faculty of Electrical Engineering at UKIM Skopje, Ninoslav Marina obtained a Ph.D. at École Polytechnique Fédérale de Lausanne (EPFL) in 2004. In partnership with Nokia Research Centre in Helsinki, his thesis was in the information theory with application to wireless communications. Ninoslav Marina was Director of R&D at Sowoon Technologies from 2005 to 2007. From 2007 to 2008 he was Visiting Scholar at the University of Hawaii at Manoa. After that, from 2008 to 2009, he worked as a postdoctoral researcher at the University of Oslo. During the period 2010–2012 Ninoslav Marina was Visiting Postdoctoral Research Associate at Princeton University. He still holds a Visiting Research position at Princeton.

Scientific  achievements 
Prof. Marina has been a guest professor at twenty universities, including United States, Japan, United Kingdom, Israel, Russia, Brazil, Hong Kong, Norway, Finland, Portugal, and the Czech Republic. He has an excellent record and experience in fund raising through various public funding instruments both in academia and industry, including programs such as the Swiss CTI, Swiss NSF, the European Commission and the European Space Agency. He has been an evaluator expert and a reviewer within European Commission’s 6th and 7th Framework Program. Dr. Marina is a Senior Member of the Institute of Electrical and Electronics Engineers (IEEE), and is one of the co-founders of the Macedonian Chapter of the IEEE Information Theory Society.

References

Living people
Electrical engineers
Macedonian academic administrators
Scientists from Skopje
People from Ohrid
École Polytechnique Fédérale de Lausanne alumni
Year of birth missing (living people)
Academic staff of the University of Information Science and Technology "St. Paul The Apostle"